The 1994 International League season took place from April to September 1994.

The Richmond Braves defeated the Syracuse Chiefs to win the league championship.

Attendance
Charlotte Knights - 404,861
Columbus Clippers - 535,145
Norfolk Tides - 557,586
Ottawa Lynx - 607,190
Pawtucket Red Sox - 477,911
Richmond Braves - 530,200
Rochester Red Wings - 370,050
Scranton/Wilkes-Barre Red Barons - 476,053
Syracuse Chiefs - 366,684
Toledo Mud Hens - 304,827

Standings

Stats

Batting leaders

Pitching leaders

Regular season

All-Star game
The 1994 Triple-A All-Star Game was held at Herschel Greer Stadium in Nashville, Tennessee, home of the American Association's Nashville Sounds. The All stars representing the National League affiliates won 8-5. Richmond Braves catcher and first baseman Luis Lopez won the top award for the International League.

Playoffs

Division Series
The Syracuse Chiefs won the East Division Finals over the Pawtucket Red Sox, 3 games to 1.

The Richmond Braves won the West Division Finals over the Charlotte Knights, 3 games to 1.

Championship series
The Richmond Braves won the Governors' Cup Finals over the Syracuse Chiefs, 3 games to none.

References

External links
International League official website 

 
International League seasons